The British Rail Class 323 are electric multiple unit (EMU) passenger trains built by Hunslet Transportation Projects and Holec. All 43 units were built from 1992 through to 1995, although mock-ups and prototypes were built and tested in 1990 and 1991.

Entering service in 1994, the 323s were among the last trains to enter service with British Rail before its privatisation in the mid-1990s. The units were designed to operate on inner-suburban commuter lines in and around Birmingham and Manchester with swift acceleration and high reliability. Of the 43 units built, 26 are in operation with West Midlands Trains and 17 with Northern Trains. In the first half of 2024 the West Midlands Trains units are planned to be replaced by new Class 730 EMUs, and 34 units will be operated by Northern Trains.

The units are known for the distinctive sounds that can be heard during acceleration or deceleration. These sounds are generated by the traction electronics.

Background
In 1990 the Regional Railways sector of British Rail tendered an order for new electrical multiple units, both to replace older electric units around Birmingham and Manchester, and to work services on the newly electrified Birmingham Cross-City Line. In June 1990, the contract was awarded to Hunslet Transportation Projects of Birmingham, a new company set up by a team of engineers and managers who had left Metro-Cammell (at that time a Birmingham-based train builder). It won the contract in competition with six other European train builders. The trains were designed in Birmingham, but built and fitted out at the Hunslet works in Leeds.

Initially 37 units were ordered, with the option for fourteen more. When the electrification of the Leeds/BradfordSkipton/Ilkley Airedale/Wharfedale Lines was confirmed in the early 1990s, Regional Railways and West Yorkshire PTE applied to the government for 14 units to add to those already on order. At the time, government spending on the railways was restricted due to the impending privatisation of British Rail and eventually, when funding was not forthcoming, the order was cancelled. Instead 21 second-hand Class 308 units from Network SouthEast were used until new  EMUs entered service in 2001.

The units are known for a distinctive whine made during acceleration or deceleration, rising/falling through multiple phases falsely suggestive of a motor connected to a gearbox with a great many ratios, caused by use of a gate turn-off thyristor-based inverter as part of the traction control circuitry that drives the 3-phase AC motors, a common setup in the early to mid 1990s which is notably also present in the Networker family of electric multiple units. The "gear-changing" effect is produced by the simplification of the PWM pulse pattern so as not to overload the thyristor, which switches at lower frequencies than later implementations of the variable-frequency drive and hence produces a lower-pitched sound.

Service history

British Rail service

The Class 323s were initially beset with a number of technical problems related to their traction motors, doors, traction converters, gearbox and vibration at high speed which took several years to resolve, preventing them from entering service. The first unit finally entered revenue-earning service on 7 February 1994. A mixed fleet of elderly diesels which the 323s had been intended to replace as well as some elderly ,  and  electric units were drafted in to operate Cross-City Line services until the problems were resolved. Electric services began on 26 November 1992 on the northern section of the Cross-City Line, before the entire route was energised in June the following year. The 323s became reliable enough to operate a full service in 1995.

Post-privatisation service
As part of the privatisation of British Rail, all 43 were sold to Porterbrook in 1994 and allocated to the Central Trains and North West Regional Railways shadow franchises.

West Midlands

Central Trains inherited from British Rail a fleet of 26 units in two blocks; 323201–323222 and 323240–323243. In November 2007, these passed to London Midland when it took over the franchise.

In December 2017, West Midlands Trains took over the West Midlands franchise, and the 323s passed to that company. It is expected that they will be replaced by new  units on the Cross-City Line in the first half of 2024.

To celebrate 30 years service in the West Midlands unit 323221 was repainted into the Centro livery.

North West

They are used on the Manchester electrified network, primarily to the south of the city.

At the time of the privatisation of British Rail, the Regional Railways North West franchise was re-branded North Western Trains, and it inherited 17 of these units (323223–323239). North Western Trains became First North Western in 1998 and its operations were taken over by Northern Rail in 2004. All passed to Arriva Rail North with the franchise in April 2016, and then to current operator Northern Trains on 1 March 2020.

The fleet is currently maintained at Allerton TMD, with units terminating in Manchester stabled at Stockport Edgeley carriage sidings where they receive overnight cleaning as well as Ardwick TMD operated by Siemens, where they are washed alongside the Class 185 TransPennine Express fleet. The 323s were formerly maintained at Longsight Electric TMD.

In the future the fleet will be stabled and maintained at Manchester International Depot.

Accidents and incidents
On 18 December 2008, unit 323231 collided with a Nissan 4x4 which had rolled down the embankment from a delivery company car park at North Rode, Congleton. The unit spent 16 months out of service to undergo repair as a result.

On 17 December 2019, unit 323234 derailed in the Ardwick train depot. The train rolled approximately 4 feet away from the railhead and where it had ended up. No one was hurt in the accident as it occurred at a low speed.

Future 

The Northern Trains 323 fleet will be retained, replacing the older s, and being joined by 17 units cascaded from West Midlands Trains.

Class 323s operated by both Northern Trains and West Midlands Trains received a full refurbishment between 2018 and 2021, with the first refurbished units delivered to West Midlands Trains in February 2019, and the first Arriva Rail North unit (323234) returning on 22 October 2019. The rest of fleet was refurbished to the same standard over the following years.

These works involved the replacement of seat covers, interior and exterior repainting (into the new livery of their respective operators), the installation of a new passenger information system and wheelchair call-for-aid buttons, and the addition of an accessible toilet in place of the original small toilet cubicles, among other modifications. The last Class 323 unit to be refurbished (323224) returned to Northern Trains on 23 January 2021, while the last West Midlands Trains 323 unit (323226) was returned in 2020.

Many of these changes were a requirement of the PRM (Persons with Restricted Mobility) TSI, with which all UK trains have to be compliant.

In mid-to-late 2019, a number of West Midlands Train's Class 323 units were used for an in-service pilot test of retrofitted Double Variable-Rate Sanders, sponsored by the Rail Safety and Standards Board. The test demonstrated that the new sanding equipment significantly improved braking performance in low-adhesion conditions.

Fleet details

Vehicle numbers ranges are as follows:
 DMS: 64001–64043 and 65001–65043
 TS: 72201–72239 then 72340–72343

Named units
A number of units are named these are as follows:
 323201: Duddeston
 323202: Butlers Lane
 323203: Aston
 323204: Selly Oak
 323205: Blake Street
 323206: Barnt Green
 323207: Bournville
 323208: Five Ways
 323209: Birmingham New Street
 323210: Shenstone
 323211: Four Oaks
 323212: Bromsgrove
 323213: Sutton Coldfield
 323214: Wylde Green
 323215: Gravelly Hill
 323216: University
 323219: Kings Norton
 323220: Lichfield Trent Valley
 323221: Northfield (subsequently de-named)
 323222: Redditch
 323240: Erdington
 323241: Dave Pomroy 323 Fleet Engineer 40 Years Service.
 323242: Alvechurch
 323243: Longbridge

Notes

References

Sources

Further reading

323
Train-related introductions in 1994
25 kV AC multiple units